Indotyphlops porrectus, the slender worm snake, is a species of harmless blind snake in the family Typhlopidae.  The species is endemic to South Asia. There are no subspecies that are recognized as being valid. Not further Study available about this species. Because their number is almost non-existent and their picture has not been recorded yet۔

Geographic range
Indotyphlops porrectus is found in Bangladesh, India, northern Myanmar, Pakistan, and Sri Lanka. 

The type locality given is "Hurdwár, ... Calcutta, ... foot of the Parisnáth hill (in Western Bengal), ... base of the Rangnu valley below Darjíling, ... and south of Agra" [northern and eastern India].

Description
Indotyphlops porrectus is small and slender. There are 18 scale rows around the body. It is brown or blackish dorsally, and paler ventrally. The snout, chin, and anal region are whitish.

Reproduction
Indotyphlops porrectus is oviparous.

References

Further reading

Boulenger GA (1893). Catalogue of the Snakes in the British Museum (Natural History). Volume I., Containing the Families Typhlopidæ ... London: Trustees of the British Museum (Natural History). (Taylor and Francis, printers). xiii + 448 pp. + Plates I-XXVIII. (Typhlops porrectus, pp. 19–20).
Constable, John Davidson (1949). "Reptiles from the Indian Peninsula in the Museum of Comparative Zoölogy". Bulletin of the Museum of Comparative Zoölogy at Harvard College 103 (2): 59-160. (Typhlops porrecta, p. 112).
Cox, Meryl J.; Nabhitabhata, Jarujin (1997). "Geographic Distribution, Typhlops porrectus ". Herpetological Review 28 (1): 53.
Khan MS (1999). "Typhlops ductuliformes a new species of blind snakes from Pakistan, with notes on extralimital T. porrectus Stoliczka, 1871 (Serpentes: Typhlopidae)". Pakistan J. Zool. 31 (4): 385–390.
Stoliczka F (1871). "Notes on some Indian and Burmese Ophidians". Journal of the Asiatic Society of Bengal, Calcutta 40: 421-445 + Plates XXV-XXVI. (Typhlops porrectus, new species, pp. 426-428 + Plate XXV, figures1-4).
Wall F (1910). "A New Blind Snake from the Western Himalayas". Journal of the Bombay Natural History Society 19: 805–806. (Typhlops mackinnoni, new species).
Wall F (1913). "Some New Snakes from the Oriental Region". J. Bombay Nat. Hist. Soc. 22: 514–516. (Typhlops venningi, new species, pp. 515-516 + 3 figures).
Wallach V (2000). "Critical review of some recent descriptions of Pakistani Typhlops by M. S. KHAN, 1999 (Serpentes: Typhlopidae)". Hamadryad 25 (2): 129–143.

External links
 

porrectus
Reptiles of Pakistan
Taxa named by Ferdinand Stoliczka
Reptiles described in 1871